The 2017 European Weightlifting Championships were held in Split, Croatia from 2 April to 8 April 2017.

Medal overview

Men

Women

Men's results

Men's 56 kg

Men's 62 kg

Men's 69 kg

Men's 77 kg

Men's 85 kg

Men's 94 kg

Men's 105 kg

Men's +105 kg

Women's results

Women's 48 kg

Women's 53 kg

Women's 58 kg

Women's 63 kg

Women's 69 kg

Women's 75 kg

Women's 90 kg

Women's +90 kg

Medals tables

Results including snatch and clean & jerk medals

Total results

References

External links
EWF results
IWF results 

European Weightlifting Championships
International weightlifting competitions hosted by Croatia
2017 in weightlifting
2017 in Croatian sport
Sport in Split, Croatia
April 2017 sports events in Europe